"A Girl Like You" is a song by Scottish singer-songwriter Edwyn Collins from his third solo studio album, Gorgeous George (1994). The song samples the drum track of Len Barry's single "1-2-3" (1965). It was released as a single in December 1994 and became a worldwide hit, reaching number one in Flanders and Iceland and peaking within the top 10 in several countries, including Australia, France, Germany and the United Kingdom. In North America, "A Girl Like You" reached number 16 on Canada's RPM Top Singles chart, number 32 on the US Billboard Hot 100 and number 28 on the US Cash Box Top 100.

Production
The Sex Pistols drummer Paul Cook performed on the recording. The song had started out as "a more thrashy kind of guitar thing" and there had been a suggestion that Iggy Pop might record a version for the US market but before that could happen Collins' version was gaining airplay.

Critical reception
Steve Baltin from Cash Box felt that Collins "has one of the year’s more surprising hits with this very Bowie-esque song that’s been all over Modern Rock for the past month." He added, "Slightly funky and very catchy, “A Girl Like You” is a track that will get under your skin." In his weekly UK chart commentary, James Masterton declared it as "magical", noting that "hardcore Northern Soul meets the 1990s to delicious effect." A reviewer from Music Week gave it four out of five, commenting, "Ignored by the UK last November but scoring throughout the rest of Europe, the white-soul-swinging track gets a timely re-release." Charles Aaron from Spin commented that here, Collins "opens his throat (and maybe even his heart), crooning with what sounds like aching conviction, "You've made me acknowledge the devil in me / I hope to God I'm talkin' metaphorically." The production is irresistibly off-beat with Spectorish drums, tinkling vibes, laconically searing fuzz guitar and squishy faux-turnable scratches. Plus, I love the way he pronounces "protest singers" (rhymes with "Miss Otis lingers")."

Track listings

 CD single
 "A Girl Like You" – 3:59
 "A Girl Like You" (Macramé remix by Youth) – 5:42

 French CD single
 "A Girl Like You" – 3:59
 "Out of This World" (Remixé par St-Etienne) – 4:58

 CD maxi
 "A Girl Like You"	
 "Don't Shilly Shally"
 "Something's Brewing"
 "Bring It On Back"

 Cassette single
 "A Girl Like You" – 3:59
 "If You Could Love Me" (acoustic version)

 CD maxi
 "A Girl Like You"		
 "If You Could Love Me" (acoustic version)		
 "Don't Shilly Shally" (spotter's 86 demo version)		
 "You're on Your Own"

Charts and certifications

Weekly charts

Year-end charts

Certifications

Release history

Appearances
The song appeared on the soundtrack of the 1995 film Empire Records and on that of 2003 film Charlie's Angels: Full Throttle. It was also featured in season 1, episode 5 of Lucifer ("Sweet Kicks"), and in the 2022 horror film Goodnight Mommy. It also plays over the end credits in season 5, episode 7 of The Crown.

See also
Ultratop 50 number-one hits of 1995

References

External links

1994 songs
1995 singles
Edwyn Collins songs
Songs written by Edwyn Collins
Black-and-white music videos
Number-one singles in Iceland
Ultratop 50 Singles (Flanders) number-one singles
Setanta Records singles